LEAP Legal Software is a technology company that develops practice management software for the legal profession which includes, legal accounting, document assembly, management and legal publishing assets. LEAP Legal Software provides a cloud-based legal practice management software to clients in Australia, Canada, the United States, the United Kingdom, the Republic of Ireland and New Zealand. LEAP is used by more than 61,000 users worldwide and it is developed by LEAP Dev. 

The company is a privately held corporation headquartered in Sydney, Australia, with additional offices in Sydney, Melbourne, Brisbane, Perth and Adelaide. LEAP expanded to the UK and US markets in 2014 and 2015. Presently, LEAP has offices in Toronto, New Jersey, Twickenham, Manchester, Edinburgh, Cardiff, Brighton, Dublin and Kraków.

History 
LEAP Legal Software was founded  in 1992 by Christian Beck. In 2008, LEAP acquired LegalPax, a provider of automated forms and precedents to law firms in Queensland. At the beginning of 2010, LEAP launched a cloud software called LEAP Expedite. It also purchased BING! Software, a family law precedents business. LEAP Office 10 was launched at the NSW State Legal Conference in August 2010. In 2012, LEAP Expedite was replaced with a rewritten cloud product. LEAP began rolling out the cloud version of its software to law firms in Australia in January 2013.

LEAP expanded to the UK and US markets in 2014 and 2015.  

LEAP 365 was the first software-as-a-service legal application for the Australian market. LEAP 365 was released for the UK and US markets at an event at Yankee Stadium on September 12, 2016.

In 2019, LEAP entered into a joint venture with LexisNexis Legal Professional to operate PCLaw | Time Matters.

LEAP expanded to Canada in 2020 and to New Zealand in 2022.

Software 
LEAP Legal Software's flagship product is LEAP, a legal practice productivity solution. The key features of LEAP include legal practice management, document assembly and management, automated matter types and forms, a client and contact database, file sharing, time recording, billing and trust accounting tools, and legal publishing assets. All LEAP data is stored in AWS (Amazon Web Services) in dedicated facilities around the world.

LEAP Legal Software introduced mobile app integration in mid-2013. In November 2021, LEAP created the LEAP App for iPad.

Integration with Microsoft 
LEAP was integrated with Microsoft Office in 2002. In January 2016, LEAP completed an integration with the new Microsoft Office 365 software allowing complex document assembly to occur in the cloud rather than the desktop.

Awards 

 Winner, “Best Software as a Service – USA (SMB),” 20212022 International Cloud Computing Awards Program, The Cloud Awards
 Winner, “Overall Case Management Platform of the Year,” LegalTech Breakthrough Awards 2021
 Winner, Established Business of the Year Award and No. 1 in Law Category, Australian Digital Technology Awards 2021
 Australian Financial Review Top Ten Most Innovative Technology Companies, 2020
 Australian Deloitte's Technology Fast 50 in 2004, 2008 and 2009

Leadership 
 Christian Beck, Founder
Richard Hugo-Hamman, Executive Chairman
Mark Burgess, Chief Technology Officer of LEAP Legal Tech

Corporate development

Acquisitions 
LEAP Legal Software has acquired several companies and brands: 
 Law Perfect in 2007
 BING! in 2008 
 LegalPax in 2008
 LawWare in 2012
 Peapod Legal Software in 2013
 Edgebyte in 2014
 Perfect Software (Perfect Books) in 2015
Turbolaw in 2020
DivorceMate in 2021

Internal start-up: InfoTrack 
Initially a division of LEAP known as LEAP Searching, InfoTrack was launched as a separate company in 2012 and has since been brought under the umbrella company of Australian Technology Investors.  It had a reported annual revenue of A$144 million in 2015.

References

Companies based in Sydney
Software companies of Australia